Service Children's Education (SCE) is an organisation of the United Kingdom government responsible for the education of the children of British Armed Forces families and Ministry of Defence (MoD) personnel serving outside of the United Kingdom. They provide schools and educational support services from Foundation Stage through to sixth form. They are headquartered at Trenchard Lines, Upavon, Wiltshire.

It was previously an executive agency of the MoD, but this status was removed on 31 March 2013 following the reduction of service personnel based abroad. However, it continues to operate under the SCE name as part of the MoD's Directorate Children and Young People (DCYP).

History

During the 1980s, the British Families Education Service (BFES) was renamed Service Children's School (SCS). In 1997 it took its current name Service Children's Education (SCE). Despite the various changes to the name and administration, it continues the mission of its predecessors: providing education for the children of British Armed Forces personnel. Former teachers who taught in SCE schools or under its previous incarnations the BFES and SCS may join the BFES/SCE Association.

Management

Headquarters and offices
SCE are headquartered at Trenchard Lines, Upavon, Wiltshire. The business support office are co-located with that of the Children's Education and Advisory Service since August 2012.

SCE was headquartered in the Wegberg Military Complex in Wegberg, Germany,  until 2012. It briefly moved to JHQ Rheindahlen, until that base closed, too, in 2013.

In addition SCE have offices in Bielefeld, Germany and Episkopi Cantonment, Cyprus.

Curriculum
Schools follow the English National Curriculum, administer national assessments and public examinations, and are inspected by Her Majesty's Inspectorate, via Ofsted. Teachers have recognised UK professional qualifications and the majority are recruited specially from the United Kingdom through the Civil Service.

Schools
The agency operates primary and secondary schools in Europe and Asia and also provides educational facilities in territories such as the Falklands and Gibraltar where there is a significant British military presence. The schools are typically grouped by garrison (including its outlying bases).

Schools are:

 Belgium
SHAPE Primary School (British section), Supreme Headquarters Allied Powers Europe, Belgium

 Brunei
 Treetops Early Years Setting and Hornbill Primary School (Seria)

 Cyprus
King Richard Secondary School, Dhekelia
St. John's Secondary School, Episkopi
Akrotiri Early Years Setting and Akrotiri Primary School, RAF Akrotiri
Ayios Nikolaos Early Years Setting and Ayios Nikolaos Primary School, Ayios Nikolaos Station
Dhekelia Early Years Setting and Dhekelia Primary School
Episkopi Early Years Setting and Episkopi Primary School

 Falkland Islands
Mount Pleasant Primary School, RAF Mount Pleasant, Falklands

 Germany
 Attenborough Early Years and Attenborough Primary School (Sennelager)
 St David’s Primary School (Ramstein)

 Gibraltar
 Sunflowers Early Years Setting and St Christopher’s Early Years Foundation Stage 

 Italy
BFS Naples Primary School , Italy

 Netherlands
 AFNORTH Primary School (Brunssum)

Former Schools

Germany 
Secondary schools

Cornwall School, Dortmund
Edinburgh School, Münster
 Gloucester School, Hohne (closed July 2015)
 Havel School, RAF Gatow, Berlin. Closed 1994. Was also the primary school until the building of Gatow First school in 1977
 Kent School, Hostert, near Schwalmtal (boarding school) (closed 1993)
 King Alfred School, Plön (closed 1959)
 King's School, Gütersloh (closed 2019)
 Prince Rupert School, Rinteln (closed July 2014)
 Windsor Boys' School, Hamm  (boarding school) (closed 1983)
 Windsor Girls' School, Hamm (boarding school)
 Windsor School, formerly Queen's School, Rheindahlen (closed July 2013)
Virtual Tour of the Windsor School / Windsor Boys School Hamm, Germany

Primary/middle schools
Alanbrooke Primary, Dortmund, BFPO20
Andrew Humphrey School, WWildenrath (closed 2012)
Ark Primary School, JHQ Rheindahlen (closed July 2013)
Attenborough First School, Sennelager
Attenborough Primary School, Sennelager
Ayrshire Barracks Primary School, Mönchengladbach
Bad Salzuflen School, Bad Salzuflen
Bader First School, RAF Brüggen
BFES Germany RAF Borgentreich
 Bielefeld School, Bielefeld
 Bishopspark First School, Paderborn
 Blankenhagen School, Gütersloh
Brüggen School, Elmpt, formerly RAF Bruggen (closed July 2015)
Buckeburg Primary School, Buckeburg (now Immanuel Schule Schaumburg)
Bünde Primary School
Cambridge Infant School, Münster
Cheshire Middle School, RAF Bruggen
Charlottenburg First School (closed 1990s) – Its facilities was taken over by the newly founded Berlin British School in 1994.
Churchill School (with annex in Kiel), Verden. Closed 1993
 Dalton Middle School, Düsseldorf
Derby School, Osnabrück (closed 2008)
Fleming Primary School, Enger
Gatow First School Berlin, Headmaster John Hancock (1977-1994), (school closed on 4 November 1994)
Griffon School, RAF Wildenrath (became Andrew Humphrey School in c1992)
 Haig Primary School, Gütersloh
Hakedahl Primary School, Detmold
Hameln School, Hameln
Hampshire School, Monchengladbach. Closed 2001
Hamm Primary
Hannover Primary School
Hastenbeck Primary School, Hastenbeck
Heide School, Fallingbostel
Hemer Primary School
Herford Primary School, Herford (split into Lister and Fleming)
Hildesheim Primary School
Hobart Primary School, Detmold
Iserlohn Primary School
Jerboa Primary School, Soltau
John Buchan Middle School, Sennelager
John Buchan School, Sennelager (closed 2019)
Krefeld Primary School (closed in 2002) – It is now the site of Franz-Stollwerck-Schule.
Lancaster School, Minden
Lippstadt Primary School, Lippstadt
Lister Primary School, Herford (closed in July 2015)
Maas First school, RAF Laarbruch
Marlborough School, Osnabrück
Merlin School, RAF Wildenrath (closed in 1991)
Möhne Primary School, Soest
Montgomery School, Hohne
Mountbatten Primary School, Celle
Oxford Primary School, Münster (closed in 2013)
Pegasus Primary School, RAF Wildenrath
Rhine Middle School, RAF Laarbruch
 Robert Browning School, Paderborn
Scott School Fallingbostel
Shackleton School, Fallingbostel
Sir John Mogg Primary School, Detmold (closed July 2014)
Slim School, Bergen
Spandau Primary School, Berlin
St Andrew's Primary School, Rheindahlen
St Barbara's Primary School, Wulfen
St Christopher's Primary School, Rheindahlen
St Clements Primary School, Wickrath
St David's Junior School, Rheindahlen
 St David's Primary School, Ramstein
St George's Primary School, Rheindahlen
St Patrick's Primary School, Rheindahlen
St. Peter's Primary School, Lübbecke
Suffolk School, Minden
Talavera Primary School, Werl
Tower School, Dülmen
Trenchard School, Gütersloh
Wavell Primary School, Bergen
Wellington First School, Osnabrück
Wetter Primary School, Wetter (Ruhr)
Wildenrath Primary, Wildenrath
 William Wordsworth First School, Sennelager
York Junior School, Münster

Gilbraltar
St. Christopher's Middle School, Gibraltar

Hong Kong 
Gun Club Hill Primary School, Hong Kong
Minden Row Junior School, Kowloon, Hong Kong
Sek Kong Primary School, New Territories, Hong Kong
St. Andrew's Primary School, Kowloon, Hong Kong
Stanley Fort Primary School, Hong Kong
St George's School (closed 1996) – The Australian International School Hong Kong uses some of its former facilities.,
Victoria Junior School, Victoria Barracks, Hong Kong

Singapore 
Secondary schools
Alexandra Grammar School. Later merged into Bourne School, it is now the site of ISS International School Preston campus.
Bourne School
Alexandra/Gillman Secondary Modern School – later merged into Bourne School, the former compound (including Gillman Barracks) is now occupied by an art gallery, the NTU Contemporary Art Singapore (NTU CCA), and other small businesses.
St John's School. In 1971, the United World College of South East Asia, then known as the Singapore International School, was established at St John's former campus; it adopted its present name in 1975.

Primary schools
Alexandra Junior School
Changi Junior School
Nee Soon Primary School
Pasir Panjang Junior School
Seletar Junior School
Tengah Junior School

Infants schools 
Tanglin Infants School, Tanglin Barracks, Dempsey Road
Alexandra Infant School
Pasir Panjang Infant School

Malta
Infants schools
Army Children's School St Andrew's Pembroke
Royal Naval School Verdala (now the Liceo Guzeppi Despott Junior Boys Lyceum)
RAF Luqa
RAF School for Infants Safi
St David's Mtarfa
Army Children's School Tigne

Secondary schools
Royal Naval School Tal Handaq (now the Liceo Vassalli Junior Lyceum)

Other countries
Colony of Aden (now in Yemen)
Khormaksar School, RAF Khormaksar

Belgium
Emblem Primary School, Antwerp

Belize 
Toucan School, BATSUB (closed 2011)

Brunei
BSCS Berakas
BSCS Muara

Malaysia
Bourne School, Kuala Lumpur 
Slim School, Cameron Highlands (1951–64, re-opened in Malacca in 1965 at Terendak Camp)
The Army School, Johore Bahru, Malaysia

Norway
St George's School, Bekkestua, Oslo

Nepal
Dharan school, Dharan camp

See also
British Families Education Service
Naval Education Service
Queen's Army Schoolmistresses
Royal Army Educational Corps

References

External links
Official website
BFES/SCEA Association – association for former BFES, SCEA, SCS and SCE teachers and alumni
SCE Schools (Archive)
SCE connected Learning community (SCEcLc)
Archives - IOE

Recollections & Photographs of former SCE schools
The Army Children Archive

 
Aftermath of war
Defunct executive agencies of the United Kingdom government
Education in the United Kingdom
Defence agencies of the United Kingdom
Organizations for children affected by war
Organisations based in Wiltshire